John Craig (7 December 1918 – 21 July 1976) was a Scotland international rugby union player.

Rugby Union career

Amateur career

He played for Heriot's.

Provincial career

He was capped for Edinburgh District.

International career

He was capped once for Scotland.

References

1918 births
1976 deaths
Scottish rugby union players
Scotland international rugby union players
Heriot's RC players
Edinburgh District (rugby union) players
Sportspeople from Kolkata
Rugby union wings